Pruidze may refer to:

 Giorgi Pruidze
 Irina Pruidze
 Samson Pruidze